The 2010 United States House of Representatives elections in Tennessee was held on November 2, 2010, to elect the nine U.S. representatives from the state of Tennessee, one from each of the state's nine congressional districts. 

During the general elections, the Republicans flipped Tennessee's 4th, 6th, and 8th congressional districts, which changed Tennessee's House delegation from a 5-4 Democratic majority to a 7-2 Republican majority.

Overview

By district
Results of the 2010 United States House of Representatives elections in Tennessee by district:

District 1

This district covers northeast Tennessee, including all of Carter, Cocke, Greene, Hamblen, Hancock, Hawkins, Johnson, Sullivan, Unicoi, and Washington counties and parts of Jefferson County and Sevier County. It had been represented by Republican Phil Roe since 2009.
The winner of the GOP primary was all but assured of representing the district in Congress as this is one of the safest seats for the GOP; it had held the seat continuously since 1881 and, since prior to the Civil War, the GOP or its predecessors had held the seat for all but four years.

Democratic primary 
Michael Clark

Republican primary 
Phil Roe, incumbent
Mahmood "Michael" Sabri

General election 

 Race ranking and details from CQ Politics
 Campaign contributions from OpenSecrets
 Race profile at The New York Times

District 2

This district lies in the east central part of the state, based in Knoxville and is largely coextensive with that city's metropolitan area. It had been represented by Republican Jimmy Duncan since November, 1988.  The winner of the GOP primary was all but assured of representing the district in Congress as this was one of the safest seats for the GOP (even safer than the neighboring First District); the GOP or its predecessors had held the seat continuously since prior to the Civil War.

Democratic primary 
Dave Hancock

Republican primary 
Jimmy Duncan, incumbent

General election 

 Race ranking and details from CQ Politics
 Campaign contributions from OpenSecrets
 Race profile at The New York Times

District 3

Republican Representative Zach Wamp announced that he would be running for governor in 2010, leaving the third district open.

Democratic primary 
Alicia Mitchell
Brenda Freeman Short
Brent Davis Staton
John Wolfe Jr., attorney and perennial candidate
Larry J. Abeare, Sr (write-in)

Republican primary 
Tommy Crangle
Chuck Fleischmann, attorney
Tim Gobble
Harvey Howard
Jean Howard-Hill
Van Irion
Rick Kernea
Basil Marceaux, perennial candidate
Art Rhodes
Robin Smith, former TNGOP Chairwoman
Grover Travillian

General election 

 Race ranking and details from CQ Politics
 Campaign contributions from OpenSecrets
 Race profile at The New York Times

District 4

Democratic incumbent Lincoln Davis ran for re-election, challenged by Republican nominee Scott DesJarlais, a physician in Jasper, and Independents Paul H. Curtis (PVS), James Gray (campaign site, PVS), Richard S. Johnson (PVS), and Gerald York (campaign site, PVS).

Davis had represented the district since 2003. He turned down a run for governor, deciding to run for re-election instead.

This district lies in Middle and East Tennessee.

Scott DesJarlais (R) won the election.
 Race ranking and details from CQ Politics
 Campaign contributions from OpenSecrets
 Race profile at The New York Times

General election

District 5

This district lies in Middle Tennessee, including almost all of Davidson County, half of Wilson County, and half of Cheatham County. Nearly two-thirds of the district's voting population lives in Nashville. It had been represented by Democrat Jim Cooper since 2003.

Jim Cooper (D) won re-election.
 Race ranking and details from CQ Politics
 Campaign contributions from OpenSecrets 
 Race profile at The New York Times

General election

District 6

This district lies in Middle Tennessee, including all of Bedford, Cannon, Clay, DeKalb, Jackson, Macon, Marshall, Overton, Putnam, Robertson, Rutherford, Smith, Sumner, and Trousdale Counties, as well as a portion of Wilson County. It had been represented by Democrat Bart Gordon since 1985. Gordon announced on December 14, 2009 that he would not be seeking another term, leaving the sixth district open.

State Senator Jim Tracy, State Senator Diane Black, Rutherford County Republican Chairwoman Lou Ann Zelenik, United States Army Reserve Major General Dave Evans, realtor Gary Mann, and businessman Kerry Roberts ran for the Republican nomination. Democratic candidates included lawyer and Iraq veteran Brett Carter, aviation safety inspector George Erdel, ex-marine Ben Leming, Henry Barry, and Devora Butler.

The nominees were Brett Carter (D) and Diane Black (R).

Diane Black (R) won the election.
 Race ranking and details from CQ Politics
 Campaign contributions from OpenSecrets
 Race profile at The New York Times

General election

District 7

This district lies in Middle and southwestern Tennessee, connecting suburbs of Memphis and Nashville. It had been represented by Republican Marsha Blackburn since 2003. She faced a challenge from Austin Peay University professor and Democrat Dr. Greg Rabidoux.

Marsha Blackburn (R) won re-election.
 Race ranking and details from CQ Politics
 Campaign contributions from OpenSecrets
 Race profile at The New York Times

General election

District 8

Democratic incumbent John S. Tanner, who had represented the district since 1989, announced his retirement in December 2009 leaving the eighth district open.

Steve Fincher was the Republican nominee, and State Senator Roy Herron was the Democratic nominee. Also on the ballot are Tea Party candidate Donn Janes (campaign site, PVS), who earlier dropped out of the Republican primary, and Independent Mark J. Rawles (campaign site, PVS).

This district covers roughly the northwestern part of the state.

Stephen Fincher (R) won the election.
 Race ranking and details from CQ Politics
 Campaign contributions from OpenSecrets
 Race profile at The New York Times

Endorsements 
Herron had been endorsed by the state's two largest newspapers, the Memphis Commercial Appeal and the Nashville Tennessean.

Fincher had been endorsed by former Governor Winfield Dunn, Citizens United, Eagle Forum, Family Research Council, Concerned Women for America, and State Senator Dolores Gresham.

Forecasts 
As of October 22, 2010, Rothenberg Political Report rated the race as "Lean Republican", Real Clear Politics as "Leans GOP". Charlie Cook as "Lean Republican", CQ Politics as "Likely Republican", Larry Sabato as "Likely R", and Chris Cillizza of The Washington Post placed the race at number 23 of the races most likely to change party hands.

District 8 has a PVI of R+13. In the 2008 presidential election, Republican U.S. Senator John McCain carried the district with 56% of the vote.

Polling

General election

District 9

This district lies in southwestern Tennessee, located entirely within Shelby County and including most of the city of Memphis. It had been represented by Democrat Steve Cohen since 2007. The Republicans nominated Charlotte Bergmann, who owns a Memphis-based marketing firm, Effective PMP, LLC.

Steve Cohen (D) won re-election.
 Race ranking and details from CQ Politics
 Campaign contributions from OpenSecrets
 Race profile at The New York Times

General election

References

External links
 Elections from the Tennessee Department of State
 Official candidate list
 U.S. Congress Candidates for Tennessee at Project Vote Smart
 Tennessee U.S. House from OurCampaigns.com
 Campaign contributions for U.S. Congressional races in Tennessee from OpenSecrets
 2010 Tennessee General Election graph of multiple polls from Pollster.com

 House - Tennessee from the Cook Political Report

 Tennessee Election Guide from Congress.org

Tennessee
2010
2010 Tennessee elections